Eripnopelta is a genus of braconid wasps in the family Braconidae. There is at least one described species in Eripnopelta, E. ithyvena, found in China.

References

Further reading

 
 
 

Microgastrinae